Pussycat was a Dutch country and pop group led by the three Veldpaus-sisters: Toni, Betty, and Marianne. Other members of the band were guitarists Lou Willé (Toni's then-husband), Theo Wetzels, Theo Coumans, and John Theunissen. Their song "Mississippi" was a #1 hit in most European countries, including the UK, in 1975/76.

Career
Prior to forming the band, the three sisters were telephone operators in Limburg, whilst Theunissen, Wetzles, and Coumans were in a group called Scum. Lou Willé played in a group called Ricky Rendall and His Centurions until he married Toni, and created the group Sweet Reaction that eventually became known as Pussycat.
 
In 1975 they scored a big European hit with the song "Mississippi".  However they had to wait a further year for the single to make the British charts when it climbed to number one in the UK Singles Chart in October 1976. Penned by Werner Theunissen, who had been the sisters' guitar teacher, it is estimated that "Mississippi" sold over five million copies worldwide. It was followed by "Smile" in 1976, and "Hey Joe" in 1978. Other hits were "If You Ever Come to Amsterdam", "Georgie", "Wet Day in September" and "My Broken Souvenirs". Their career in Europe spanned more than a decade and included some seventeen albums. By 1978 Hans Lutjens had replaced Coumans on drums, as the band continued to release albums and tour, travelling as far afield as South Africa. They made regular appearances on the West German TV series, Musikladen, in the late 1970s and early 1980s.

Band-members
 Toni Veldpaus (married Willé) – lead vocals (1975–85)
 Betty Veldpaus (married Dragstra) – singing (1975–85)
 Marianne Veldpaus (married Hensen) – singing (1975–85)
 Lou "Loulou" Willé (Toni's then husband) – guitar (1975–85)
 John Theunissen – guitar (1975–80)
 Ferd Berger – guitar (1981–82)
 Kees Buenen – keyboards (1981–82)
 Theo Wetzels – bass guitar (1975–80)
 Theo Coumans – drums (1975–78)
 Hans Lutjens – drums (1978–80)
 Frans Meijer – drums (1981–82)

Discography

Albums

Singles

See also
 List of performers on Top of the Pops
 List of artists who reached number one on the UK Singles Chart
 List of country music performers
 List of bands from the Netherlands

References

External links

 Official website Pussycat / Toni Willé
 Pussycat biography by Amy Hanson, discography and album reviews, credits & releases at AllMusic
 Pussycat discography, album releases & credits at Discogs
 Pussycat albums to be listened as stream on Spotify

 
Dutch country music groups
Dutch pop music groups
Musical groups from Limburg (Netherlands)
Brunssum
Female-fronted musical groups